The 2010 Southern Miss Golden Eagles football team represented University of Southern Mississippi in the 2010 NCAA Division I FBS football season. The team's head coach was Larry Fedora, who was in his third year at Southern Miss. They played their home games at M. M. Roberts Stadium in Hattiesburg, Mississippi and competed in the East Division of Conference USA. They finished the season 8–5, 5–3 in C-USA play and were invited to the Beef 'O' Brady's Bowl, where they were defeated by Louisville, 31–28.

Schedule

Roster

References

Southern Miss
Southern Miss Golden Eagles football seasons
Southern Miss Golden Eagles football